A statue of Josiah Quincy III by Thomas Ball (sometimes called Josiah Quincy) is installed outside Boston's Old City Hall, in the U.S. state of Massachusetts.

Description
The bronze sculpture measures approximately  ft. 4 in. x 2 ft. 8 in. x 2 ft. 8 in., and rests on a granite base that measures approximately 9 ft. 6 in. x 7 ft. 7 in. x 7 ft. 7 in.

History
The statue was modeled in 1878, cast in 1879, and dedicated on September 17 of that year. It was surveyed by the Smithsonian Institution's "Save Outdoor Sculpture!" program in 1993.

See also

 1879 in art

References

External links
 

1879 establishments in Massachusetts
1879 sculptures
Bronze sculptures in Massachusetts
Granite sculptures in Massachusetts
Monuments and memorials in Boston
Sculptures of men in Massachusetts
Statues in Boston